Luke 4 is the fourth chapter of the Gospel of Luke in the New Testament of the Christian Bible, traditionally attributed to Luke the Evangelist, a companion of Paul the Apostle on his missionary journeys. This chapter details Jesus' three temptations, the start of his "Galilean Ministry", and his rejection at Nazareth, which Luke contrasts with his acclaim in nearby Capernaum.

Text
The original text was written in Koine Greek and is divided into 44 verses.

Textual witnesses
Some early manuscripts containing the text of this chapter are:
Papyrus 4 (AD 150-175; extant verses: 1-2, 29-32, 34-35)
 Codex Vaticanus (325-350)
 Codex Sinaiticus (330-360)
 Codex Bezae (~400)
 Codex Washingtonianus (~400)
 Codex Alexandrinus (400-440)
 Codex Ephraemi Rescriptus (~450; extant verses 26-44)
 Papyrus 7 (4th-6th century; extant verses 1-2)

Old Testament references
:  
 : Psalm 
 : Isaiah 61:1–2

Jesus' three temptations (4:1-13)

Jesus, as in Matthew 4 and Mark 1, travels into the desert and fasts for forty days. He is confronted by Satan, who tempts (or tests) him. 'Tested' is the preferred wording of several modern translations, e.g. the Contemporary English Version, Expanded Bible and New Testament for Everyone. 

First, Satan commands him to turn stones into bread. Jesus replies "Man does not live on bread alone",(4) quoting Moses from Deuteronomy 8:3: Man shall not live by bread alone. The words but by every word of God, which reflect the Deuteronomy text (by every word that proceeds from the mouth of the LORD), are added in the Textus Receptus but absent from critical texts of the Greek New Testament.
Secondly, Satan shows Jesus "... all the kingdoms of the world" (5) and tells him that he can have them all if he falls down and worships him. Jesus replies with a further quote from Deuteronomy 6:13, "It is written: 'Worship the Lord your God and serve him only.'" (8)
Finally, Satan takes Jesus to the top of the Temple of Jerusalem and quotes Psalm 91:11-12 as a criterion for a test of favor with God, to which Jesus quotes Deuteronomy 6:16, "... Do not put the Lord your God to the test." (12).

This narrative is also found in Matthew 4:1–11, but in Matthew the order of the second and third temptations is reversed. This was most probably in Q if that hypothesis is correct; perhaps their copies of Q were in a different order? This difference in orders presents a challenge for redactional criticism. It is unclear whether in Q, if it existed, the order was originally the same as Luke's and Matthew changed it to have it end on a mountain, a common motif of Matthew, such as Matthew 5:1 and Matthew 28:16, or Luke changed it to have the temptations end in Jerusalem. Luke ends his gospel in Jerusalem in Luke 24. Most scholars believe Matthew's order was the order Q used.

Verse 13
Luke then says that Satan left Jesus "for a season" 
or "until an opportune time". Satan appears later in Luke 22, entering Judas and leading him to betray Jesus. Brown sees his return in  when Jesus says to those arresting him "But this is your hour — when darkness reigns". Commentary writer Frederic Farrar argues that this does not mean Jesus faced no other temptations during his life, quoting Bonaventure's view that "he endured temptations, too, at other times".

Rejection at Nazareth (4:14-30)

Jesus returns to Galilee "in the power of the Spirit", says Luke, and teaches in many of the synagogues there. One Shabbat, he goes to the synagogue in his hometown of Nazareth, gets up and reads a section of the Book of Isaiah, Isaiah 61:1–2, referring to himself as the fulfillment of this prophecy. Luke's text uses the Septuagint version, but the version Jesus read would have been in Hebrew.

The people are amazed at his assertion, but Jesus goes on the rebuke them, saying "I tell you the truth ... no prophet is accepted in his hometown."

Verses 25–30
But in truth, I tell you, there were many widows in Israel in the days of Elijah, when the heavens were shut up three years and six months, and a great famine came over all the land, and Elijah was sent to none of them but only to Zarephath, in the land of Sidon, to a woman who was a widow.

He tells them how in the time of Elijah only a woman from Sidon (the widow of Zarephath) was saved (verses 25–26), and during the time of Elisha a Syrian (Naaman) was healed (verse 27). Outraged, the people attack him and chase him to the top of a hill and try to throw him off, but Jesus slips away through the crowd and continues "on his way". There are many hills in and around Nazareth, although the Upper Galilee region, further to the north, is more mountainous.

The event is perhaps also depicted, though not word for word, in Mark 6:1-6 and Matthew 13:53-58.

Teaching and healing (4:31-41)

Jesus goes to Capernaum and exorcises a possessed man in the synagogue, the first of Luke's 21 miracles. He goes to Simon's house and heals his sick mother-in-law. Mark 1 has this occur after Jesus called his disciples, while Luke puts that event into chapter 5.

He heals more and more people, then retreats to the wilderness for solitary prayer. They come and find him there but he tells them that he must also go to the surrounding towns, where he is to travel and preach the good news of the Kingdom of God, "because that is why I was sent". Johann Bengel notes: Here is Jesus’ "Creed": the reason for His many journeyings".

Jesus preaches in Galilee (4:42-44)
In verse 44, Luke affirms that Jesus continued preaching in the synagogues of Galilee. Some ancient manuscripts (א, B, C, L and other uncials) refer to τὰς συναγωγὰς τῆς Ἰουδαίας, tas synagōgas tēs Ioudaias, the synagogues of Judea.

See also
Elisha
Mount of Temptation
Naaman
Physician, heal thyself
Related Bible parts: 2 Kings 5, Psalm 146, Isaiah 61, Matthew 4, Matthew 8, Mark 1

References

Further reading
 Brown, Raymond E., An Introduction to the New Testament, Doubleday 1997 
 Miller, Robert J.-Editor, The Complete Gospels, Polebridge Press 1994

External links

 King James Bible - Wikisource
English Translation with Parallel Latin Vulgate
Online Bible at GospelHall.org (ESV, KJV, Darby, American Standard Version, Bible in Basic English)
Multiple bible versions at Bible Gateway (NKJV, NIV, NRSV etc.)

Luke 04
Phoenicians in the New Testament
Temptation of Christ